The LG Optimus 2X is a smartphone designed and manufactured by LG Electronics. The Optimus 2X is the world's first smartphone with a dual-core processor and the third phone in the LG Optimus-Android series. LG introduced the Optimus 2X on December 16, 2010 and the device first became available to consumers in South Korea in January 2011. It was also launched in Singapore on March 3, 2011. The Optimus 2X runs the Android 2.3 software version since the upgrade in November 2011, but the latest offering is Android 4.0. The phone holds the record for the longest update holdout, taking 16 months to receive a firmware update from Android 2.2 to 2.3.

Hardware
The LG Optimus 2X holds the Guinness World Record as the first mobile phone to use a dual-core processor. It is the first smartphone to feature the Nvidia Tegra 2, a dual-core processor clocked at 1 GHz or 1.2 GHz. It also has a micro HDMI port and an 8-megapixel camera.  The Optimus 2X is capable of HD playback through the micro HDMI port when connected to an HD device, such as an HDTV.

Display
The LG Optimus 2X has a 4-inch LCD IPS capacitive touch-screen, displaying 16.7 million colours at 480×800 pixels.

Storage & Memory
The LG Optimus 2X has a card slot for additional memory. It supports a microSD card of up to 32 GB capacity. It has up to 8 GB of internal memory storage and 512 MB RAM (384 MB available) or 1 GB RAM (496 MB available).

Camera
An 8-megapixel camera is included on the Optimus 2X and is capable of 3264x2448 pixels. The camera includes auto focus and a LED flash. A secondary front-facing 1.3-megapixel camera is located on the front of the device but it cannot make use of the LED flash on the back of the phone. The primary camera is capable of video recording of 1080p at 24 fps, or 720p at 30 fps.

Modifications

The aftermarket Android firmware Cyanogenmod has been developed for the Optimus 2X. Official CyanogenMod support was added in CyanogenMod 7.1.

History
LG previewed the Optimus 2X under the device's internal development name, "LG Star", at CES 2011.

Naming variations
 LG Optimus Speed
 LG Optimus 2X / LG Optimus Dual / LG P990 / LGP990h / LG P990hn (h and hn models supported different frequencies)
 T-Mobile G2X / LG P999
 LG Star (platform name)
 LG Star Dop (platform name)
 Optimus 2X SU660 - different ROM (kernel patched) and software revision than P990. SU660 has 3 buttons on the bottom (P990 has 4 buttons)

See also
 LG Optimus
 List of LG mobile phones
 Comparison of smartphones
 Galaxy Nexus

Other phones with Tegra 2 SoC:
 Samsung Galaxy R
 Motorola Atrix
 Motorola Photon
 Droid X2

Notes

References

External links
LG Optimus 2X official website

Reviews
Phonearena.com review by PhoneArena Team, 01 Feb 2011
GSMArena.com review by GSMArena team, 7 February 2011.
engadget.com review by engadget team, 7 February 2011
Test of the dual-core smartphone LG Optimus 2X

Android (operating system) devices
LG Electronics mobile phones
Mobile phones introduced in 2011
Mobile phones with user-replaceable battery
Discontinued smartphones